Yves-Joseph de Kerguelen-Trémarec (13 February 1734 – 3 March 1797) was a French Navy officer. He discovered the Kerguelen Islands during his first expedition to the southern Indian Ocean. Welcomed as a hero after his voyage and first discovery, Kerguelen fell out of favour after his second voyage and was cashiered for violating Navy regulations. He was rehabilitated during the French Revolution.

Kerguelen also authored books about expeditions and about French naval operations during the American Revolutionary War.

Biography

Early life
He was born in Landudal, Brittany. During the Seven Years' War, Kerguelen-Trémarec was a privateer, but without much success.

Rockall 

In 1767 he sailed near Rockall, or Rokol. Although he may not have approached within sight of it, or even within 150 miles, he appears to have had good information regarding it. His charted position for it was only 16 miles north of its actual position and he accurately described its appearance and the nearby Helen's Reef: "East of Rokol, ¼ league away, there is a submerged rock over which the water breaks". In 1771, he published a map of the area.

Discovery of the Kerguelen Islands 
In early 1772, he was assigned command of the third French expedition sent  in search of the fabled Terra Australis with the fluyts Fortune and Gros Ventre.  The expedition discovered the isolated Kerguelen Islands north of Antarctica in the southern Indian Ocean and claimed the archipelago for France before returning to Mauritius. He was accompanied by the naturalist Jean Guillaume Bruguière.  In his report to King Louis XV, he greatly overestimated the value of the Kerguelen Islands; consequently, the King sent him on a second expedition with the 64-gun Roland and the 32-gun frigate Oiseau, but was again unsuccessful in finding Terra Australis. By now, it had become clear that the Kerguelen islands were desolate and quite useless, and certainly not the Terra Australis.

Upon his return, Kerguelen was court-martialled in Brest for bringing his mistress aboard, in defiance of Navy regulations. He was found guilty on 25 May 1776.

French Revolution 
During the French Revolution, he was seen as a victim of the Ancien Régime and restored to his position, taking part in the Battle of Groix. He died in 1797 as a Rear Admiral and commander of the port of Brest.

Works

Notes, citations, and references 
Notes

Citations

References

 Lyubomir Ivanov and Nusha Ivanova. Bouvet and Kerguelen. In: The World of Antarctica. Generis Publishing, 2022. pp. 70–72. 

1734 births
1797 deaths
French explorers
18th-century Breton people
People from Finistère
Explorers of Antarctica
18th century in Antarctica
18th-century explorers
French military personnel of the French Revolutionary Wars